John Watson (born 1877, date of death unknown) was a Scottish professional footballer at the turn of the twentieth century.

Born in Dundee, he played for Dundee Wanderers before relocating to England to join New Brompton of the Southern League, where he played regularly for two seasons. He then returned to Scotland to play for Dundee, before joining Everton, where he made 44 appearances in the English Football League. He then moved on to Tottenham Hotspur, his last known club.

References

1877 births
English Football League players
Gillingham F.C. players
Dundee Wanderers F.C. players
Dundee F.C. players
Everton F.C. players
Tottenham Hotspur F.C. players
Scottish footballers
Year of death missing
Association football fullbacks